Shannon Boyd-Bailey McCune (April 6, 1913 – January 4, 1993) was an American geographer.

Early life and education
Shannon Boyd-Bailey McCune was born in Sonchon, in what is now North Korea, as the son of Presbyterian educational missionaries George McCune and Helen McAfee. His older brother was George M. McCune. He also had two sisters. After receiving his elementary education in Korea, the younger McCune moved to the United States for college, graduating with a bachelor's degree from the College of Wooster in 1935. He earned a master's degree from Syracuse University. After receiving his Ph.D. in geography from Clark University in 1939, McCune taught at Ohio State University.
He married and had three children.

He was the chairman of the geography department at Colgate University from 1947 to 1955, and the provost of the University of Massachusetts Amherst from 1955 to 1961. In 1960, while acting president of UMass, he received an honorary Doctor of Laws from his alma mater Clark. He left academia and the United States to serve as the first civilian civil administrator of the Ryukyu Islands from 1962-64. He became the president of the University of Vermont in 1965, but resigned one year later for a research trip to Asia. From 1969 to his retirement in 1979, he was a professor of geography at the University of Florida in Gainesville.

Bibliography

References

1913 births
1993 deaths
American geographers
Clark University alumni
Colgate University faculty
College of Wooster alumni
Ohio State University faculty
Syracuse University alumni
Presidents of the University of Vermont
20th-century geographers
People from North Pyongan
American expatriates in Korea
American expatriates in Japan
20th-century American academics